WR 150 is a Wolf-Rayet star in the constellation of Cygnus. It is one of the early-type carbon sequence (WCE), and is of spectral type WC5. WR 150 is very far from the Earth, being 28,500 light-years from it.

Properties 
Wolf-Rayet stars are extremely hot stars, and WR 150 is no exception, and is even hotter than most Wolf-Rayet stars. WR 150 has a temperature approaching 90,000 K, similar to WR 111. However unlike WR 111, WR 150 is more than 3 times more luminous than it. As a result, intrinsically, WR 150 is a full magnitude brighter than WR 111. 

WR 150 loses mass much more quickly than almost any WC star. It loses 10-4.19 M☉ (about ) a year, on a strong stellar wind with a terminal velocity of 3,000 kilometres per second. This means that in 50,000 years, WR 150 will have lost around 3.2 solar masses.

References

Wolf–Rayet stars
Cygnus (constellation)